"Her Diamonds" is the lead single from Rob Thomas's second studio album, Cradlesong (2009). Thomas confirmed the single's release via a Twitter account he had created on March 11, 2009. The single premiered on April 22, preceding the release of Cradlesong on June 30. On July 3, 2009, Thomas confirmed in an interview with Natalie Morales and Lester Holt on NBC's Today show that the song references his wife Marisol's auto-immune disease. Thomas announced his wife sang backup on the track and also helped produce its arrangement.

Chart performance
On the Billboard Hot 100 the song reached number 23, his highest peak since 2005's hit "Lonely No More". On the Hot Adult Top 40 Tracks radio airplay chart, "Her Diamonds" debuted at number 27. The track would go on to top the Billboard Hot Adult Top 40 Tracks chart the week of August 8, becoming Thomas' third number one to date and extending Thomas' streak of top-five singles as a solo artist on the format to six (seven if including "Smooth", his collaboration with Santana).

During its first week of release, it was the most added song to radio in Australia. While on the ARIA Singles Chart the song debuted at number eight and later rose to number three. The song performed well on the Canadian Hot 100. It moved from number 64 to number 42 and then to a peak of number 27. The song also became a massive radio hit, peaking at number 1 on the Australian airplay chart and staying at the top spot for 5 weeks.

Music video
The music video for the song was directed by Dave Meyers and the video as well as behind the scenes can be seen on Rob Thomas's official website.

The video premiered on May 12, 2009 on VH1.com. The video features American actress Alicia Silverstone. The video starts with scenes of a blue, icy, background. In this background (which is actually ice) reflections of Thomas singing are shown. Later, the video shows Silverstone completely trapped in ice and motionless sitting on a bed in a room. The sun shining through the window melts the ice until Silverstone is shown shivering. She falls to the floor, still shivering. Later, more scenes of Thomas singing are shown, and the video ends with Silverstone gazing out the window at the rising sun. The video reached number one on both Billboard's hot videoclips chart and VH1's top 20 countdown.

Visual effects for the video were created by Baked FX.

Track listing
Best Buy exclusive CD single edition
"Her Diamonds" – 4:40
"Overrun" – 4:12

Australian CD single
"Her Diamonds" – 4:40
"Overrun" – 4:11

Charts

Weekly charts

Year-end charts

Sales and certifications

References

2009 singles
2009 songs
Atlantic Records singles
Music videos directed by Dave Meyers (director)
Rob Thomas (musician) songs
Song recordings produced by Matt Serletic
Songs written by Rob Thomas (musician)